"Keep Tryin'" or Keep Trying may refer to:

Keep Tryin' (Groove Theory song)
Keep Tryin' (Hikaru Utada song)
"Keep Tryin'", a 1977 song by Mandré

See also
Keep On Trying (disambiguation)